The Dallas 1957 chess tournament was played in Hotel Adolphus in Dallas, then the tallest building in Texas, from November 30 to December 16, 1957. The main event was a contest among eight players from seven countries. Three Polish-born grandmasters participated; Samuel Reshevsky, Miguel Najdorf and Daniel Yanofsky. David Bronstein from the Soviet Union got no visa for a visit to Texas. Pál Benkő defeated Ken Smith in a match that was played as a side event. The time control was 40 moves in two hours, followed by 20 moves in one hour. A bulletin was published for each round, and Isaac Kashdan functioned as commentator.

Results
The results and standings:

Gligorić and Reshevsky got $1750 each, Szabo and Larsen $750 each, Yanofsky  $210, Olafsson $195, Najdorf $165, and Evans $150.

References

Chess competitions
Chess in the United States
1957 in chess
1957 in the United States
Sports competitions in Dallas
1957 in sports in Texas
20th century in Dallas